Events from the year 1970 in Sweden

Incumbents
 Monarch – Gustaf VI Adolf 
 Prime Minister – Olof Palme

Events
20 September – The 1970 Swedish general election is held.

Births
 26 February – Cathrine Lindahl, curler, Olympic champion in 2006 and 2010.
 24 April – Patrik Juhlin, ice hockey player.
 13 June – Mikael Ljungberg, wrestler, Olympic champion in 2000 (died 2004).

Deaths

 1 October – Vilhelm Carlberg, sport shooter (born 1880).
 10 December — Nelly Sachs, German-Swedish poet and playwright (born 1891)

References

 
Sweden
Years of the 20th century in Sweden